Ejutla is a town and municipality, founded in 1544 in Jalisco in central-western Mexico. The municipality covers an area of 472.21 km².

As of 2005, the municipality had a total population of 1888.

References

Municipalities of Jalisco